Mistake is a 2013 Bengali drama film directed by S.K. Bengalore

Plot
Mistake is a story which hovers around the life of five friends. The story explores the problems faced by students during their college and university. It shows that if the right time for right work is not used, then it can lead to serious problems. Preeti Jhangiani, Vikram Chatterjee, Malabika, Sourav and Clio are seen in the shoes of five friends while actress Indrani Halder essays a key character. Other actors like Kunal Padhy, Biswajit Chakraborty, Dulal Lahiri and Barun Chatterjee are also in the movie.

Cast
 Vikram Chatterjee
 Preeti Jhangiani
 Malabika
 Sourav
 Clio
 Indrani Halder
 Kunal Padhy
 Biswajit Chakraborty
 Dulal Lahiri
 Barun Chatterjee

References

External links
 

Bengali-language Indian films
2010s Bengali-language films
2013 films
Films set in Kolkata